Andrei Andreyevich Fajt (29 August 1903 – 17 January 1976) was a Soviet film actor. He appeared in 44 films between 1925 and 1976. He was born in Nizhny Novgorod, Russia and died in Moscow. In Russian documents, his surname was written according to the traditional Russian transcription of German names and titles (Feith).

Selected filmography

 The Battleship Potemkin (1925)
 The Bay of Death (1926)
 The Happy Canary (1929)
 The Great Consoler (1933)
 Outskirts (1933)
 Dzhulbars (1933)
 The Thirteen (1937)
 Wish upon a Pike (1938)
 Minin and Pozharsky (1939)
 Siberians (1940)
 Salavat Yulayev (1941)
 The Young Guard (1948)
 Encounter at the Elbe (1949)
 The Battle of Stalingrad (1949)
 The Composer Glinka (1952)
 Admiral Ushakov (1953)
 The Star (1953)
 A Lesson in History (1957)
 The Idiot (1958)
 On Distant Shores (1958)
 The Secret of the Fortress (1959)
 Peace to Him Who Enters (1961)
 Kingdom of Crooked Mirrors (1964)
 Aladdin's Magic Lamp (1966)
 Strong with Spirit (1967)
 Fire, Water, and Brass Pipes (1968)
 The Diamond Arm (1969)
 The Lanfier Colony (1969)
 The Crown of the Russian Empire, or Once Again the Elusive Avengers (1971)
 Privalov's Millions (1972)
 Hopelessly Lost (1973)
 The Flight of Mr. McKinley (1975)
 The Little Mermaid (1976; Posthumous Release)
 How Czar Peter the Great Married Off His Moor'' (1976; Posthumous Release)

References

External links

1903 births
1976 deaths
Soviet male film actors
Russian male film actors
Russian male silent film actors
Honored Artists of the RSFSR
Burials at Novodevichy Cemetery
Male actors from the Russian Empire